

Background
There were 3 By-elections held within 1966, with the first triggered just 4 months the expulsion from Malaysia on 8 December 1965. Lim Huan Boon from Barisan Sosialis (BS), who started the trigger of the BS boycott of Parliament because they claimed that Singapore's independence was "phony" on the grounds that the separation matter was not discussed in the legislature and announced that all of its MPs would resign their seats and take their struggle for democracy onto the streets. Hence, with the exception of Dr Fong Kim Heng from People's Action Party who resigned his seat on November, 6 other vacant constituencies are caused by the mass resignation from the members of BS legislators that are divided into 3 phases that triggers 3 different by-elections in the year, namely, January, March and November. The final phase of the resignation by BS legislators was made in 1967 January and hence shortly 3 months after the third by election in 1966 November, a 1967 by election was held, which is the last before 1968 general elections.

First 1966 By Election (January)
The nomination day was set at 8 January 1966 while the polling day was held 10 days later as the result of the resignation of Lim Huan Boon which translates into the vacation of Bukit Merah constituency.

Second 1966 By Election (March)
Shortly after the first in January, another 3 BS members, namely S. T. Bani, Chio Cheng Thun and Kow Kee Seng have resigned their seats as a part to boycott the parliament. Hence, it further translates into the vacant of Chua Chu Kang, Crawford and Paya Lebar constituency which sets the nomination day on 1 March 1966. However, all 3 constituencies went uncontested and returned to PAP without conducting a poll.

Third 1966 By Election (November)
BS members Chia Thye Poh and Lee Tee Tong resigned their seats. Also People's Action Party member, Dr Fong Kim Heng had resigned his seat on the grounds of poor health. With three resignations taking place, it vacates three seats, namely Bukit Timah, Joo Chiat and Jurong constituencies. Similar to the previous by election, all three seats were announced as walkovers to the People's Action Party on nomination day, 2 November 1966.

Election deposit
All three By Elections' deposit were set at $500.

Aftermath of 1966 By Election
The aftermath of the boycott of the Parliament sparked off mass arrests under the Internal Security Act (ISA), with notable people includes Chia Thye Poh who was detained under this Act for 22 years without any trial which became the world's second-longest incarcerated political prisoner. It is also meant the downturn of the opposition parties in Singapore as since then, Barisan Sosialis had lost all their credibility and never returned to the parliament by an elected Member of Parliament while the People's Action Party had been winning all the parliamentary seats in the General elections and By elections until 15 years later on the famous 1981 Anson By Election.

Results

Bukit Merah by-election (18 January)

By-elections of 1 March 1966

By-elections of 2 November 1966

References

1966
Singapore
1966 in Singapore
January 1966 events in Asia
March 1966 events in Asia
November 1966 events in Asia